Alicja Eigner (born 18 September 1958) is a retired Polish para table tennis player who competed in international level events. She is a European champion, a double World bronze medalist and a Paralympic bronze medalist. She has won team event medals with Natalia Partyka, Malgorzata Jankowska and Katarzyna Marszal.

References

1958 births
Living people
People from Legnica
Paralympic table tennis players of Poland
Table tennis players at the 2012 Summer Paralympics
Medalists at the 2012 Summer Paralympics
People with polio
Polish female table tennis players